Makinson Island is one of three islands in Lake Tohopekaliga, Osceola County, Florida. It was purchased by the State of Florida on December 31, 1998, in cooperation with the Florida Fish and Wildlife Conservation Commission (FWC), The Trust for Public Land and Osceola County. Ownership was transferred to FWC on October 6, 1999. The park is managed by Osceola County as a natural refuge with trails, primitive camping sites, and a pavilion. The island was planned to developed into time-shares before it was purchased by the state. The island came with a derelict 34-passenger boat that was restored by Walt Disney World Resort and Mercury Marine and named "Spirit of Osceola".

References

External links 
 Osceola County Parks Brochure

Islands of Florida